The graceful lead-toed gecko (Hemidactylus gracilis) is a species of small-sized gecko found in India. The holotype was described in British India in Berar (what is now Amravati).

Description
The head is narrow and elongated, with the snout a little longer than the distance between the eye and the ear-opening. The forehead is not concave, the ear-opening is small and roundish. The body and limbs are slender.

The snout has polygonal rugose scales, the back of the head has small granules.

The body is covered above with coarse granules intermixed with oval, subtrihedral, strongly keeled tubercles arranged in about twelve irregular longitudinal series. Abdominal scales are large.

The tail is round, but slightly depressed at the base and not at all further back, tapering, without any enlarged or spinose tubercles whatever. Grey above, with subquadrangular black spots arranged in longitudinal series. There is a black streak white-edged above on the side of the head, passing through the eye; whitish beneath, with or without longitudinal grey lines.

Type locality: southeastern Berar and Reipur, Central Provinces.

Notes

References
 Annandale, Nelson 1912 Zoological results of the Abor Expedition, 1911–1912. Rec. Indian Mus., Calcutta, 8 (1): 7-59 [Reptilia, pages 37–59] (supplement in same journal, 8 (4): 357–358, 1914).
 Blanford, W.T. 1870 Notes on some Reptilia and Amphibia from Central India. J. Asiat. Soc. Bengal  39: 335-376

External links
 

Hemidactylus
Reptiles of India
Endemic fauna of India
Reptiles described in 1870
Taxa named by William Thomas Blanford